Lavajibhai Rajani is a Member of Legislative assembly from Maliya constituency in Gujarat for its 12th legislative assembly. Lavajibhai Rajani died on 15 May 2021.

References

Living people
Bharatiya Janata Party politicians from Gujarat
Gujarat MLAs 2007–2012
Year of birth missing (living people)